Ohlthaver & List Group (short O&L or Ohlthaver & List) is the largest private Namibian company group. It has its headquarters in Windhoek central business district.

The company was founded in 1919 by Carl List and Herman Ohlthaver. It was headquartered near the post office. In 1929 a bigger building was bought on the corner of Peter Müller (today Fidel Castro Street) and Kaiserstraße (today Independence Avenue). This building was soon named Carl List Haus. It is today known as the Alexander Forbes House and still the headquarters of the company group.

The company is in its third generation, and owner of Wernhil Park Mall facilities. It is the largest private-sector employer in the country and has over 5,000 employees.

Companies
O & L include:

 O&L Centre - Property and shopping area
 Broll Namibia - real estate acquisition, management
 Namibia Breweries Limited
 Hangana - fishing and processing
 Namibia Dairies, including the Super dairy farm !Aimab - milk production and processing, milk products
 Model Pick 'n Pay Namibia - Trading Company
 O&L Leisure - Hotels
 Kraatz - Engineering
 Dimension Data Namibia - Information Technology
 Windhoek abattoir - slaughterhouse
 Eros Air - in-house charter airline
 O&L Project Management
 O&L Nexentury
 windhoek schlachterei
 Weathermen & Co
 O&L Fresh Produce
 BrandTribe
 Hartlief
 O&L Organic Energy Solutions

References

External links
Ohlthaver & List
Ohlthaver & List Annual Reports 

Retail companies established in 1919
Companies based in Windhoek
1919 establishments in South West Africa